Provincial road N434 is a planned Dutch provincial road that will connect the A4 motorway with the A44 motorway near Leiden.

Route description

History

Future

Exit list

See also

References

434